Sibselmash Stadium is a sports venue in Novosibirsk. It is the home of Sibselmash.

External links
Official homepage

References

Bandy venues in Russia
Sport in Novosibirsk